A Summer in the Country is a 1980 Italian pornographic film directed by Roberto Girometti and Gérard Loubeau. It stars Gil Lagardère, Jane Baker, Brigitte Lahaie, Lidie Ferdics and Julia Perrin. The film is also known by the titles Le segrete esperienze di Luca e Fanny in Italian, Ein Sommer auf dem Lande in German and Ultimate Secrets d'Adolescentes in French.

Plot
15 year old Luca, the son of a wealthy couple arrives at a summer holiday destination a day before anticipated. The couple also host Fanny, a vivacious 16 year old daughter of a couple of friends. Luca's aunt Martha, the strict housekeeper of the Corsican seaside villa constantly scolds and supervises their young and sexy maids Simona and Gina. Both of them have very high sexual appetite and often have sex with strangers whenever they get an opportunity. 

That night, Luca and his parents watch the TV in the living room while Fanny reads a book. While switching her posture in the so-fa, Fanny unintentionally reveals her panties underneath her skirt which triggers Luca to fantasize them naked, caressing each other and having mutual oral sex. He goes to the Fanny's bedroom and snatch a pair of her Lingerie, wears them in his bedroom and masturbates. Later Fanny also goes to her bedroom an retrieves an erotic magazine she has hidden under the mattress and masturbates. In the kitchen while dish-washing, Simona and Gina also discusses about the sexual adventures each had earlier the day. But it only makes them further horny and Simona suggests they should help each other and the two sneaks into their room and have lesbian sex. 

Next morning, the maids find Fanny's panties with sperms in the crotch area under Luca's bed-sheets and also witnesses up-skirted Fanny wearing no panties and wrongfully deduces the two teens might have slept together. While Luca's parents assume he has become lazy, sleeping until so late, he sneak peaks at Fanny who vigorously masturbates in the toilet and goes to his room and again wear her lingerie. But before he stars masturbating, Simona and Gina who were peeping from outside the window enters the bedroom. Simona and Gina seduces Luca by taking turns and French kissing and fellating him. Aroused, Luca and Simona engage in sexual intercourse while Gina watches them. Fanny continues to masturbate on her bed while looking at her erotic magazine.

Next morning when Luca was missing while the others were enjoying the breakfast in the garden, Luca's father sends Gina to fetch him. While Luka tells them to give him a few more minutes from the balcony, Gina caresses his penis and fellates him. Later at night while watching TV, Fanny notices that Luca is continuously looking at Gina's panties while she cleans a stool. The two maids continue their Threesome with Luca to call it a day. 

Next day Martha and Fanny plays Tennis and Chess and tries to involve Luca, whom they thought were bored. Not much interested, Luca asks Simona if they can have sex but Simona insists she needs to do some laundry with Gina and goes to the basement. Following her, Luca finds a frock belonged to Martha from an old chest and poses in-front of a mirror only to be confronted to Fanny. While Fanny strips and wear it herself, Luca narrates that aunt Martha was his first sexual awakening as a kid and that he got his first erection while she was bathing him and how one night she had to share the bed with him due to party guests staying over night and how Luca up-skirted her and saw his first vagina. 

After a two night hiatus, Simona and Gina comes to Luca's bedroom and arouses him by telling about how Fanny masturbates every evening while looking at the magazine. While Simona and Luca cuddle together, Gina sneaks into Fanny's bedroom and confronts while she is masturbating. Gina gradually comforts Fanny and kisses her before giving her a Cunnilingus but not without Simona and Luca watching them from outside the window while having both vaginal and anal sex themselves. Back in Luca's bedroom the two maids continues to arouse Luca by collectively stroking his penis and telling him that Fanny is a Virgin and he must explore her, but not before the three of them engage in another threesome. 

The next day Luca takes courage and convinces Fanny to grant him her virginity. At this point Luca also wants to seduce Martha. He kisses her during a boat ride and takes her to observe a waterfall in the woods and takes the opportunity to seclude himself with her and caress her breasts and kiss her. During the night he goes to her room and Martha passionately blowjobs him before the two have sexual intercourse. Meanwhile unable to find him in his bedroom, Simona and Gina goes to Fanny's bedroom and when he's not to be found there also, initiates an erotic lesbian threesome together with Fanny.  

In the end, Fanny's parents come back to pick her up and her father, unaware of all these experiences, and decides to capture the moment by taking a photograph of all.

Cast

References

External links
 

1980 films
1980s pornographic films